The .25 ACP (Automatic Colt Pistol) (6.35×16mmSR) is a semi-rimmed, straight-walled centerfire pistol cartridge introduced by John Browning in 1905 alongside the Fabrique Nationale M1905 pistol.

Design
The cartridge is of semi-rimmed design meaning that the rim protrudes slightly beyond the diameter of the base of the cartridge so the cartridge can headspace on the rim.

Though the .25 ACP was designed for semi-automatic pistols, various .25 ACP revolvers were produced in the early twentieth century by Belgian, French, and German gunmakers such as Adolph Frank and Decker. In the late twentieth century, Bowen Classic Arms produced a custom Smith & Wesson revolver in .25 ACP.

Performance
The use of the .25 ACP allows for a very compact lightweight gun, usually pocket pistols, but the cartridge is relatively short-ranged and low-powered, putting it in the same class as the .22 LR rimfire cartridge but at a significantly higher cost. The .25 ACP is viewed by some as a better choice for personal defense handguns due to its centerfire-case design, which is inherently more reliable and more powerful than a .22 LR rimfire cartridge.

See also
 
 Table of handgun and rifle cartridges

References

External links

 Ballistics By The Inch .25ACP results.
 SAAMI Entry

 
Colt cartridges
25 ACP